Cajamarca is a town and municipality in the Tolima Department of Colombia.  The population of the municipality was 17,309 as of the 2018 census. The municipality has two populated centres, the town centre of Cajamarca and the locality of Anaime. It is located along the Pan-American Highway. 

In 1886, colonisers from Antioquia colonised the area currently known as Anaime, and started to develop the land for agriculture. In 1913, the Bishop of Ibagué Ismael Perdomo bought the land of the municipality and officially founded the municipality of Cajamarca, which stands for 'cold land' in Quechua.

The main economic activity is agriculture, and the town is also known as the 'agricultural larder' of Colombia. 

Internationally, the town is best known as the location of the La Colosa gold mining project of AngloGold Ashanti.

References

Municipalities of Tolima Department